Fabián Ulises Ramos Espínola  (4 November 1919 – 13 August 2002) was a Chilean footballer and manager.

Club career
Ramos was born in Tocopilla in 1919 to a middle-class family. Ten years later, he alongside his family moved to the capital Santiago. He attended Instituto Nacional and once graduated of there, he entered to study dentistry at University of Chile in 1937.

In 1939, he joined Audax Italiano to play professional football. After completing three goals in thirteen games with the Italics during that league season, Ramos joined the freshly founded football department of his alma mater in 1940. In his first season at Universidad de Chile, he was part of the team which reached the first league title of the football team. He remained at the team eleven years, retiring from football in 1951, completing a total of 217 matches and scoring 43 goals.

Thirty years later, in 1969, Ramos became as manager of Universidad de Chile, reaching a league title and achieving being the first to be champion as player and coach of the club.

On 13 August 2002, he died aged 82.

Honours

Universidad de Chile

Footballer
 Primera División de Chile (1): 1940

Manager
 Primera División de Chile (1): 1969

References

1919 births
2002 deaths
Chilean footballers
Chilean football managers
Audax Italiano footballers
Universidad de Chile footballers
Universidad de Chile managers
Chilean Primera División managers
Association football forwards